Amos Mansdorf was the defending champion, but lost in the semifinals this year.

Brad Gilbert won the tournament, beating Aaron Krickstein in the final, 4–6, 7–6, 6–2.

Seeds

  Brad Gilbert (champion)
  Aaron Krickstein (final)
  Amos Mansdorf (semifinals)
  Christo van Rensburg (semifinals)
  Pieter Aldrich (first round)
  Martin Laurendeau (first round)
  Christer Allgårdh (first round)
  Danilo Marcelino (second round)

Draw

Finals

Top half

Bottom half

References

 Main Draw

Singles